Bad Man's River ( and ) is a 1971 European comedy Spaghetti Western directed by Eugenio Martín and starring Lee Van Cleef, James Mason, Gina Lollobrigida and Simón Andreu. Soundtrack was composed by Tony Duhig, Peter Jonfield, Glyn Havard and Waldo de los Ríos.

Plot
Roy King's gang robs a bank and flees to Mexico on a train. Roy meets a beautiful woman, Alicia, and marries her, only to have her run off with all of the money.

An offer comes his way to rob the arsenal of a Mexican army. A daring plan gets the job done, only to have Roy double-crossed once more, unable to get his money.

Cast
 Lee Van Cleef as Roy King
 Gina Lollobrigida as Alicia King
 James Mason as Montero
 Simón Andreu: Angel Santos
 Gianni Garko: Ed Pace
 Diana Lorys: Dolores
 Sergio Fantoni: Colonel Enrique Fierro
 Aldo Sambrell: Canales
 Jess Hahn: Tom Odie
 Daniel Martín: Falso Montero
 Luis Rivera: Orozco
 Lone Fleming: Conchita
 Eduardo Fajardo: General Duarte
 José Manuel Martín: Mexican Soldier

References

External links

1971 films
1971 comedy films
1970s Western (genre) comedy films
English-language French films
English-language Italian films
English-language Spanish films
French Western (genre) comedy films
Mexican Revolution films
Spaghetti Western films
Spanish Western (genre) comedy films
1970s English-language films
1970s Spanish films
1970s Italian films
1970s French films